Micronyctemera is a genus of moths in the family Erebidae. It contains only one species, Micronyctemera fojaensis, which is found in Papua.

References

Moths described in 2007
Nudariina
Monotypic moth genera
Moths of Indonesia